Arangiz is a hamlet and concejo located in the municipality of Vitoria-Gasteiz, in Álava province, Basque Country, Spain. It is located between the N-622 motorway and Vitoria Airport.

History
It was later part of the municiaplity of Foronda until it was absorbed by Vitoria in the 1970s.

Heritage
The parish church is dedicated to Saint Peter. The building dates from the late 16th or early 17th centuries. The baroque altarpiece, dating from the early 18th century, was built by Juan Antonio Jáuregui.

References

External links
 

Concejos in Vitoria-Gasteiz